Calvin "Barry" Wagner is a Canadian retired ice hockey defenseman who was an All-American for Clarkson.

Career
Wagner was a three-year varsity player for Clarkson. He teamed up with fellow Pembroke native Pat Brophy to form a stout defensive pair for the Golden Knights and helped Clarkson finish near the top of the ECAC standings in final two seasons. Wagner helped his team reach the championship game in 1962 but the team was overwhelmed by Michigan Tech and lost the match 1–8. Wagner was named team captain for his senior season and led the Knights to a second-place finish. He was named an All-American for his defensive work and attempted to get the Golden Knights back into the NCAA Tournament. Clarkson received the second seed for the conference tournament but fell to a very strong Harvard team in the semifinal. The Golden Knights won the consolation game and believed their season was over, however, the Ivy League schools were in the midst of an argument with the NCAA over player eligibility and Harvard declined the invitation to the NCAA tournament. Clarkson, who had finished third in the ECAC Tournament, was offered Harvard's bid and they accepted. The Golden Knights couldn't overcome Denver in the semifinal but did win the consolation game, ending their season on a high note.

Career statistics

Regular season and playoffs

Awards and honors

References

External links

Year of birth missing (living people)
Living people
Canadian ice hockey defencemen
Ice hockey people from Ontario
Sportspeople from Pembroke, Ontario
Clarkson Golden Knights men's ice hockey players
AHCA Division I men's ice hockey All-Americans